The 1959–60 Oberliga  was the fifteenth season of the Oberliga, the first tier of the football league system in West Germany. The league operated in five regional divisions, Berlin, North, South, Southwest and West. The five league champions and the runners-up from the west, south, southwest and north then entered the 1960 German football championship which was won by Hamburger SV. It was Hamburg's fourth national championship and its first since 1928.

The 1960 German championship saw an attendance record for the Oberliga era with 87,739 seeing Tasmania 1900 Berlin hosting 1. FC Köln.

A similar-named league, the DDR-Oberliga, existed in East Germany, set at the first tier of the East German football league system. The 1960 DDR-Oberliga was won by ASK Vorwärts Berlin.

Oberliga Nord
The 1959–60 season saw two new clubs in the league, VfB Lübeck and Eintracht Osnabrück, both promoted from the Amateurliga. The league's top scorer was Uwe Seeler of Hamburger SV with 36 goals, the highest total for any scorer in the five Oberligas in 1959–60.

Oberliga Berlin
The  1959–60 season saw one new club in the league, SV Norden-Nordwest, promoted from the Amateurliga Berlin. The league's top scorer was Klaus Heuer of Berliner SV 1892 with 21 goals.

Oberliga West
The 1959–60 season saw two new clubs in the league, Sportfreunde Hamborn and 1958–59 DFB-Pokal winner Schwarz-Weiß Essen, both promoted from the 2. Oberliga West. The league's top scorer was Jürgen Schütz of Borussia Dortmund with 31 goals, the highest total for any top scorer in the history of the Oberliga West.

Oberliga Südwest
The 1959–60 season saw two new clubs in the league, VfR Kaiserslautern and Ludwigshafener SC, both promoted from the 2. Oberliga Südwest. The league's top scorer was Helmut Kapitulski of FK Pirmasens with 27 goals.

Oberliga Süd
The  1959–60 season saw two new clubs in the league, Stuttgarter Kickers and FC Bayern Hof, both promoted from the 2. Oberliga Süd. The league's top scorer was Heinz Strehl of 1. FC Nürnberg with 30 goals.

German championship

The 1960 German football championship was contested by the nine qualified Oberliga teams and won by Hamburger SV, defeating 1. FC Köln in the final. The runners-up of the Oberliga West and Süd played a pre-qualifying match. The remaining eight clubs then played a home-and-away round in two groups of four. The two group winners then advanced to the final.

Qualifying

|}

Group 1

Group 2

Final

|}

References

Sources
 30 Jahre Bundesliga  30th anniversary special, publisher: kicker Sportmagazin, published: 1993
 kicker-Almanach 1990  Yearbook of German football, publisher: kicker Sportmagazin, published: 1989, 
 DSFS Liga-Chronik seit 1945  publisher: DSFS, published: 2005
 100 Jahre Süddeutscher Fußball-Verband  100 Years of the Southern German Football Federation, publisher: SFV, published: 1997

External links
 The Oberligas on Fussballdaten.de 

1959-60
1
Ger